1-Fluornaphthalene is an organofluorine chemical compound from the group of naphthalene derivatives and fluoroaromatics.

Synthesis
1-Fluoronaphthalene can be obtained by reacting naphthalene with Selectfluor.

Properties
1-Fluoronaphthalene is a colorless, combustible liquid, which is insoluble in water.

Applications
1-Fluoronaphthalene was used for the tert-butyllithium-mediated synthesis of 6-substituted phenanthridines. It has also been used in the synthesis of LY248686, a potent inhibitor of serotonin and norepinephrine uptake.

1-Fluoronaphthalene is also used as a component of the Organic Check Material mounted in canisters on Mars Science Laboratory Curiosity rover. It's used for calibrating the Sample Analysis at Mars (SAM) instrument suite, being a synthetic organic compound not found in nature on Earth and not expected on Mars.

See also
1-Bromonaphthalene
1-Chloronaphthalene

References

Fluoroarenes
1-Naphthyl compounds